Distant Past may refer to:
"Distant Past" (song), by Everything Everything
 Distant Past (album), by Monster Magnet (2001) 
Distant Past (Desperate Housewives)